Switzerland was represented by the group Rainy Day with the song "Welche Farbe hat der Sonnenschein?" at the 1984 Eurovision Song Contest, which took place in Luxembourg City, Luxembourg on 5 May. Rainy Day won the rights to represent Switzerland, from winning the national final that took place on 4 February 1984. 
In the song is made a question: "What colour is the sunshine?". The group ask us "How to paint it?" They say that there are many colours, the way we see the world depends on our feelings. It was the last song of the german composer Günther Loose.

Before Eurovision

Concours Eurovision 1984 
Swiss Italian broadcaster RTSI was in charge of broadcasting the selection for the Swiss entry for the 1984 Contest. The national final was held at the RTSI studios in Lugano, hosted by Ezio Guidi and Natascha Giller. Nine songs were submitted for the 1984 national final and the winning song was chosen by 3 regional juries (DRS, TSR, TSI), a press jury, and an expert jury. Unusually, the votes from the regional juries were combined as one result, whose points were allocated based on the total number of points each song received from the said juries, and the points from the other juries were added on from there.

Other participants included past and future Swiss representatives including Arlette Zola (1982) and Carol Rich (1987).

At Eurovision
On the night of the contest Rainy Day performed 17th, following Finland and preceding Italy. At the close of the voting Switzerland had picked up 30 points, placing Switzerland in 16th place out of 19 entries. The Swiss jury awarded its 12 points to Ireland.

The Swiss conductor at the contest was Mario Robbiani.

Voting

References

External links
  Swiss National Final 1984

1984
Countries in the Eurovision Song Contest 1984
Eurovision